Lijon León (born 19 April 1943) is a Guatemalan footballer. He competed in the men's tournament at the 1968 Summer Olympics.

References

External links
 

1943 births
Living people
Guatemalan footballers
Guatemala international footballers
Olympic footballers of Guatemala
Footballers at the 1968 Summer Olympics
People from San Marcos Department
Aurora F.C. players
Association football defenders